Vypuchky is an abandoned village in Drohobych Raion, Lviv Oblast, in west Ukraine.

The village was established in the course of the Josephine colonization by German Calvinist settlers in 1785. It was arranged on cross plan and named Ugartsberg ("Ugart's Mountain"), after Alois Ugarte, Vice-Governor of Galicia. In the interwar period it was located in Lwów Voivodeship in Poland. In the late 1930s the German name of the municipality was changed to Polish Wypuczko, also Wypuczki. In January 1940 the local German population was moved out (Heim ins Reich) and afterwards the village remained abandoned.

References 

Ghost towns in Ukraine

Villages in Drohobych Raion